Blairmore is a community in the Rocky Mountains within the Municipality of Crowsnest Pass in southwest Alberta, Canada. It was formerly incorporated as a town prior to 1979 when it amalgamated with four other municipalities to form Crowsnest Pass. Blairmore is the principal commercial centre of Crowsnest Pass.

History 

Originally a Canadian Pacific Railway stop called Tenth Siding or The Springs (for the cold sulphur spring to the east), the settlement was renamed Blairmore in November 1898 and it got a post office the following year. A ten-year dispute over land ownership between the CPR station agent and the section foreman stunted early development. The community was incorporated as the Village of Blairmore on September 3, 1901. Blairmore's principal industry was lumber and, after 1907, coal. Other industries soon followed. Blairmore incorporated as a town on September 29, 1911. With the declining fortunes of the nearby community of Frank, Blairmore soon became the region's economic centre. The Greenhill mine, located just north of Blairmore, became the mainstay of the community until its closure in 1957.

One of the town's early residemts was Emilio Picariello (1875 – 1923). "Emperor Pic" settled in Blairmore in 1918 and operated several businesses, but also illegally imported alcohol from nearby British Columbia during prohibition. Picariello and Florence Lassandro were hanged in 1923 after the shooting death of Alberta Provincial Police constable Steve Lawson in 1922.

Like many Canadian industrial towns in the 1930s, Blairmore had some sympathies with Communism. Canada's first Communist town council and school board were elected in Blairmore in 1933, which reformed the tax system, and refused to observe Remembrance Day as an Imperialist holiday and honoured the Russian Revolution instead. A street was named after the leader of the Communist Party of Canada, Tim Buck, a decision that was reversed by the next town council.

On November 3, 1978, the Government of Alberta passed the Crowsnest Pass Municipal Unification Act, which led to the formal amalgamation of the Town of Blairmore with the Village of Bellevue, the Town of Coleman, the Village of Frank, and Improvement District (ID) No. 5 on January 1, 1979.

Canadian Militia 
From 1946 to 1965, Blairmore was home to Canadian Militia units associated with the Royal Canadian Electrical Mechanical Engineers. From 1946 to 1950, No. 22 Armoured Workshop existed prior to being renamed as a Troop of 39 Technical Squadron (1950-1954) and eventually the 31st Technical Squadron (1954-1965). During this time, the Squadron had a band which regularly paraded within the town as well as a 535 Royal Canadian Army Cadet Corps, which existed until 1971.

Geography 
Blairmore is located in southwest Alberta in the Canadian Rockies.

Geology
Volcanic rocks in the Blairmore area are related to the Crowsnest Formation. As a geological unit, the volcanics received some attention in the late 1980s when geologists stated they had found trace amounts of gold in certain units of the volcanics. Blairmorite, a rare volcanic rock of the Crowsnest Formation, is named after Blairmore.

Demographics 

As a population centre in the 2016 Census of Population conducted by Statistics Canada, Blairmore recorded a population of 1,545 living in 731 of its 886 total private dwellings, a  change from its 2011 population of 1,521.

See also 
List of former urban municipalities in Alberta

References 

Crowsnest Pass, Alberta
Former towns in Alberta
Populated places disestablished in 1979
1979 disestablishments in Alberta